Kidder County is a county located in the U.S. state of North Dakota.  As of the 2020 census, the population was 2,394. Its county seat is Steele.

History
The Dakota Territory legislature created the county on January 4, 1873, with areas partitioned from Buffalo County. The county government was not organized at that time, nor was the area attached to another county for administrative or judicial purposes. It was named for Jefferson Parrish Kidder, a delegate to the United States Congress from Dakota Territory (1875–1879) and associate justice of the territorial supreme court (1865-1875, 1879-1883). The county government was effected on March 22, 1881.

The county boundaries were altered on 1879 with territory partitioned to Burleigh, and in 1885 with territory partitioned from Burleigh County. Its boundaries have remained unchanged since 1885.

Geography
The terrain of Kidder County consists of hills dotted with lakes and ponds, largely devoted to agriculture. The terrain slopes to the east and south; its highest point is a hill near its northwestern corner, at 2,064' (629m) ASL.

Major highways

Lakes

 Alkali Lake
 Alkaline Lake
 Ashley Lake
 Big Muddy Lake
 Bird Lake
 Buffalo Lake
 Cherry Lake
 Dead Buffalo Lake
 Deer Lake
 Fresh Lake
 Geneva Lake
 Harker Lake
 Horsehead Lake
 Kunkel Lake
 Lake Etta
 Lake George
 Lake Helen
 Lake Henry
 Lake Isabel
 Long Alkaline Lake
 Long Lake (partial)
 McPhall Slough
 Mud Lake
 Pursian Lake
 Round Lake
 Salt Alkaline Lake
 Sibley Lake
 Swan Lake
 Upper Harker Lake
 Willow Lake
 Woodhouse Lake

Adjacent counties

 Wells County - north
 Stutsman County - east
 Logan County - south
 Emmons County - southwest
 Burleigh County - west
 Sheridan County -northwest

Protected areas

 Alkaline Lake State Wildlife Management Area
 Dawson State Game Management Area
 Hutchinson Lake National Wildlife Refuge
 Lake George National Wildlife Refuge
 Lake Williams State Game Management Area
 Long Lake National Wildlife Refuge (part)
 Slade National Wildlife Refuge
 Streeter Memorial State Park

Demographics

2000 census
As of the 2000 census, there were 2,753 people, 1,158 households, and 787 families in the county.  The population density was 2 people per square mile (1/km2). There were 1,610 housing units at an average density of 1.27 per square mile (0.49/km2). The racial makeup of the county was 99.49% White, 0.18% Black or African American, 0.11% Native American, 0.07% Asian, and 0.15% from two or more races. 0.58% of the population were Hispanic or Latino of any race. 64.2% were of German and 15.4% Norwegian ancestry.

There were 1,158 households, out of which 27.20% had children under the age of 18 living with them, 60.70% were married couples living together, 4.10% had a female householder with no husband present, and 32.00% were non-families. 29.90% of all households were made up of individuals, and 17.70% had someone living alone who was 65 years of age or older.  The average household size was 2.34 and the average family size was 2.91.

The county population contained 23.20% under the age of 18, 5.00% from 18 to 24, 22.90% from 25 to 44, 24.90% from 45 to 64, and 24.00% who were 65 years of age or older. The median age was 44 years. For every 100 females there were 103.20 males. For every 100 females age 18 and over, there were 100.10 males.

The median income for a household in the county was $25,389, and the median income for a family was $30,469. Males had a median income of $23,056 versus $17,250 for females. The per capita income for the county was $14,270. About 17.60% of families and 19.80% of the population were below the poverty line, including 20.40% of those under age 18 and 23.30% of those age 65 or over.

2010 census
As of the 2010 census, there were 2,435 people, 1,059 households, and 722 families in the county. The racial makeup of the county was 96.3% white, 0.9% Asian, 0.2% American Indian, 0.2% black or African American, 1.9% from other races, and 0.4% from two or more races. Those of Hispanic or Latino origin made up 2.9% of the population. In terms of ancestry, 65.8% were German, 21.8% were Norwegian, 8.2% were Russian, 6.0% were English, and 1.7% were American.

Of the 1,059 households, 24.3% had children under the age of 18 living with them, 58.3% were married couples living together, 5.0% had a female householder with no husband present, 31.8% were non-families, and 28.1% of all households were made up of individuals. The average household size was 2.30 and the average family size was 2.77. The median age was 47.2 years.

The median income for a household in the county was $34,250 and the median income for a family was $47,981. Males had a median income of $35,380 versus $24,330 for females. The per capita income for the county was $23,502. About 15.1% of families and 17.9% of the population were below the poverty line, including 29.1% of those under age 18 and 23.1% of those age 65 or over.

Communities

Cities

 Dawson
 Pettibone
 Robinson
 Steele (county seat)
 Tappen
 Tuttle

Unincorporated communities
 Crystal Springs
 Lake Williams

Townships

 Allen
 Atwood
 Baker
 Buckeye
 Bunker
 Chestina
 Clear Lake
 Crown Hill
 Crystal Springs
 Excelsior
 Frettim
 Graf
 Haynes
 Lake Williams
 North & South Manning
 North & South Merkel
 Northwest
 Peace
 Petersville
 Pettibone
 Pleasant Hill
 Quinby
 Rexine
 Robinson
 Sibley
 Stewart
 Tanner
 Tappen
 Tuttle
 Valley
 Vernon
 Wallace
 Weiser
 Westford
 Williams
 Woodlawn

Unorganized territories
 Kickapoo
 Liberty

Politics
Kidder County voters have traditionally voted Republican. In no national election since 1936 has the county selected the Democratic Party candidate (as of 2020).

See also
 National Register of Historic Places listings in Kidder County, North Dakota

References

External links
 Kidder County maps, Sheet 1 (southern) and Sheet 2 (northern), North Dakota DOT

 
1881 establishments in Dakota Territory
Populated places established in 1881